Battle of Namaraq  (634 CE) was a conflict between Muslims and the Sasanians that occurred in Namaraq, near modern-day Kufa (Iraq). During the Khilafat of Abu Bakr, Muslims under the command of Al-Muthanna ibn Haritha and Khalid bin Walid conquered Al-Hirah, a part of the Persian Empire. The Persians became furious and determined to recover Al-Hirah from the Muslims. Rostam Farrokhzād, a famous Sasanian general, sent some of his relatives from the Ispahbudhan family along with some Persian generals. Khalid bin Walid had already left for Syria so Muthanna had to fight alone. Umar sent Abu Ubaid with reinforcements. In the battle that followed the Persians were defeated.

References 

Muslim conquest of Persia
Muslim conquest of Mesopotamia
Namaraq
Namaraq
Namaraq